Kamal-e-Fun Award is a lifetime achievement literary award presented annually by Pakistan Academy of Letters (PAL). The award was set up in 1997 and is given to Pakistani scholars for their entire literary career. The winner receives Rs. 10,00,000.

Pakistan Academy of Letters
Pakistan Academy of Letters is a national institution with a primary focus on Pakistani literature. Inspired by the Académie Française, the academy was founded in July 1976 by a group of well-known Pakistani authors, poets, essayists, playwrights, and translators.

Recipients

See also
 Pakistan Academy of Letters

References

Pakistani literary awards
Urdu literary awards